FC Egrisi is a Georgian association football club based in the town of Senaki. The club competes in Regionuli Liga, the fifth tier of Georgian football system. 

The team has played one season in the top flight.

History
The club had different names in 1940-60s and as Spartaki, Gantiadi, Tsiskari and Kolkheti participated in the Georgian domestic league. In the most memorable event in 1970, they won the republican Cup competition. Since then the football club has been competing under the current name.   

Egrisi played in Umaglesi Liga in the 1995–96 season, but they failed to secure their place in the league. The team has since been in low leagues with most of the seasons spent in the third division.

The club successfully concluded the regional league tournament in 2018. After Liga 4 was formed the next year, they were its participant for three consecutive seasons, although a poor performance in 2021 resulted in their relegation.

Seasons

Name
Egrisi is a Georgian name for the ancient kingdom of Colchis, which covered the vast areas of contemporary Georgia.

References

External links 
Official Facebook page

On Footballfacts.ru 

On Soccerway

Egrisi Senaki
Association football clubs established in 1936